Jane Censoria Cajes-Yap (born January 10, 1990) is a Filipino politician who is known as a former president of the Sangguniang Kabataan (SK) or Youth Council in the Philippines and the incumbent city mayor of Tagbilaran, Bohol since 2022. She is the wife of former Tagbilaran city mayor John Geesnell "Baba" Yap. After winning the SK presidency in Bohol, Philippines, Cajes was elected president in the National SK Federation and with her position, also earned her a concomitant role as the Ex Officio Commissioner of the National Youth Commission (NYC).

Background 
Cajes is the second child of incumbent and former Trinidad, Bohol Mayors Roberto Cajes and Judith Cajes respectively. She completed her elementary and secondary education at the Holy Spirit School of Tagbilaran in Tagbilaran City. She studied at the Assumption College San Lorenzo for one year before transferring to the Ateneo de Manila University.

Cajes was the first woman to be elected president in the SK National Federation, and was the second president of SK National Federation who hailed from outside the Luzon area (the first being Ryan Culima of Butuan). This made her the President of the federation with the help of former Governor Erico B. Aumentado who convinced all governors to support her as the president of the federation.

She married then-Tagbilaran City Councilor and businessman John Geesnell "Baba" Yap on February 5, 2011. The wedding was called the "Wedding of the Year" in Bohol.

Yap also currently works at her family business in Tagbilaran City called Bohol Tropics Resort.

SK term in office
In her first year of term, Cajes initiated the Tri-Media Program, said to be the first in SK history in order to provide information about the Filipino youth. The said project composed of three components on the media- the internet, newspaper and radio. Various youth issues, concerns and other youth interest are tackled in the program. The first component is the www.skbohol.com, the first SK website in the Philippines. The second component is the quarterly publication, the SK Today. The maiden issue of SK Today was in Dec. 2005. The SK on Air, the official radio program made its first airing on April 2, 2006.

Cajes attended the Plan International London Incorporated on October 8–9, 2008 in Woking, Surrey, United Kingdom, London to serve as one of the panelists to interview the applicants for the new CEO of the Plan International London.

As mandated by law, the first SK National Congress was held in Cebu City. It was the highest attendance in SK history according to the Malacañang Presidential Management Staff. Cajes also led the Samahang Kabataan Volunteers Club to help the SK Bohol Federation for the implementation of its programs. The first batch, composed of 19 student leaders and SK chairmen from the province, were known as Bolahan. The second batch of SKVC has 26 members.

In December 2008, Cajes led the Sangguniang Kabtaan (SK) Kabataan Awards was created to recognize the SK leaders. Award-winning reporter and documentary host Kara Patria David  was the honored guest on the selection of the Sangguniang Kabataan (SK) Ten Outstanding Chairmen year 2 on Nov. 29, 2008.

Awards
Cajes has been honored by numerous award-giving bodies for her outstanding accomplishments as a youth leader. Incredibly attractive, Cajes has been named one of the country's "Twenty-five Hottest Young Personalities Under Twenty-Five" in 2010. She has also been the conferred as one of "The Outstanding Young Men" (TOYM) under the youth leadership category in 2010, a recognition of great prestige given by Junior Chamber International Philippines (formerly Philippine Jaycees). Moreover, Cajes was chosen as one of five recipients of 2009 "Outstanding Youth Leader Award" by the Office of the President in Malacañang.

Controversies
In April 2010, Cajes was charged before the Office of the Ombudsman-Visayas in Cebu City for the lack of transparency in her various financial dealings as SK National President and for supposedly flaunting her wealth. However, Cajes denied the charges, claiming that allegations are part of a black propaganda orchestrated by their political opponents.

During the SK National Congress 2010 held from July 28 to 30, 2010 in Panglao, Bohol, the participants urged Cajes to present financial statements during her term. The local newspapers in Bohol reported that the SK members claimed they already demanded for the financial report which Cajes failed to deliver. Allegedly unaccounted expenses included PhP10 million provided in 2008 by the Presidential Fund, PhP10 million given in 2009 by Department of Environment and Natural Resources, financial statements (FS) in 2008 regarding the hosting of Congress in Cebu, FS of 2009 congress held in Subic Bay, and FS of National Convention and launching of Sama-sama Para sa Kalikasan held in Bohol.

The participants also insisted that Cajes should likewise render her report on the donations coming from the Philippines Charity Sweepstakes Office, Philippine Amusement and Gaming Corporation, Department of National Defense and other private donors such as The Bar.

Her former staff Manuel Ferdinand De Erio and SK volunteer and publicist Leo Udtohan resigned after they allegedly discovered Cajes failure to present her financial statements for transparency and accountability. De Erio and Udtohan filed a complaint before the Ombudsman against Cajes on October 20, 2010. They sought an immediate investigation leading to the filing of appropriate criminal and administrative charges against Cajes.

In February 2013, the case against Cajes Yap was thrown out of court.

References

External links
http://www.pia.gov.ph/?m=12&fi=p081030.htm&no=34
http://balita.ph/2008/10/29/pgma-to-address-sk-national-congress-in-cebu-city-thursday/

Ateneo de Manila University alumni
Katipunan ng Kabataan
Living people
People from Cebu City
People from Tagbilaran
Politicians from Bohol
1990 births
Lakas–CMD (1991) politicians
21st-century Filipino women politicians
21st-century Filipino politicians